Peter Lakai is a New Zealand rugby union player who plays for the  in Super Rugby. His playing position is flanker or number 8. He was named in the Hurricanes squad for the 2023 Super Rugby Pacific season. He was also a member of the  2022 Bunnings NPC squad.

Lakai represented New Zealand U20s in 2022, and has been touted as a long-term successor to Ardie Savea.

References

External links
itsrugby.co.uk profile

New Zealand rugby union players
Living people
Rugby union flankers
Rugby union number eights
Wellington rugby union players
Hurricanes (rugby union) players
Year of birth missing (living people)